Edward, Ed or Ted Allen may refer to:

Arts and entertainment
 Edward Alleyn (1566–1626), also written as Edward Allen, Elizabethan actor
 Edward L. Allen (1830–1914), American photographer
 Ed Allen (musician) (1897–1974), jazz musician
 Ed Allen (writer) (born 1948), American short story writer
 Ted Allen (Edward R. Allen, born 1965), writer and television personality
 Ed Allen (TV host) (born c. 1929), television exercise instructor of the 1960s and 1970s

Politics
 Edward Allen (Australian politician) (1862–1936), Australian politician and journalist
 Edward Allen (Canadian politician) (died 1890), farmer and politician in British Columbia
 Edward H. Allen (1830–1895), U.S. politician
 Edward M. Allen (died 1907), American politician and businessman in Maryland
 Edward N. Allen (1891–1972), American politician, Lieutenant Governor of Connecticut
 Edward P. Allen (1839–1909), politician from the U.S. state of Michigan

Other
 Edward Patrick Allen (1853–1926), Roman Catholic bishop
 Edward Allen (Medal of Honor) (1859–1917), U.S. Navy sailor in the Boxer Rebellion
 Edward Henry Allen (1908–1942), U.S. Navy lieutenant
 Edward Jay Allen (1830–1915), entrepreneur, pioneer, and civil engineer
 Edward Allen (footballer), English footballer
 Eddie Allen (fullback) (1918–2012), American football fullback and college coach
 Ed Allen (American football) (1901–1979), American football player
 Ned Allen, Scottish footballer

See also
 Eddie Allen (disambiguation) 
 Edmund Allen (disambiguation)
 Edgar Allen (disambiguation)
 Edward Alleyn (disambiguation)
 Edwin G. Allen (1920–2001), New Brunswick politician
 
 Allen (surname)